Zanzan may refer to:

 Zanzan Atte-Oudeyi (born 1980), Togolese footballer
 Zanzan District, Ivory Coast
 Zanzan Region, a defunct region of Ivory Coast

See also
 Zanjan (disambiguation)